Bovicola is a genus of lice belonging to the family Trichodectidae.

The genus has cosmopolitan distribution.

Species:

Bovicola alpinus 
Bovicola bovis 
Bovicola breviceps 
Bovicola caprae 
Bovicola concavifrons 
Bovicola crassipes 
Bovicola hemitragi 
Bovicola jellisoni 
Bovicola limbatus 
Bovicola longicornis 
Bovicola multispinosus 
Bovicola oreamnidis 
Bovicola ovis 
Bovicola sedecimdecembrii 
Bovicola tarandi 
Bovicola tibialis

References

Trichodectidae